NGC 4444 is an intermediate spiral galaxy in the constellation Centaurus. The morphological classification places it midway on the continuum between a barred spiral (SB) and an unbarred spiral (SA), with an inner region that lies between a ring-like (r) and a purely spiral form (s), and medium- (b) to loosely wound (c) outer spiral arms. This makes it a hybrid ringed, barred spiral galaxy.

References

External links
 

Intermediate spiral galaxies
4444
Astronomical objects discovered in 1836
Centaurus (constellation)
041043